Operation Infinite Joy is the second solo album by Martin Tielli of the band Rheostatics, released in 2003 on Six Shooter Records.  This was the first album to be released as part of the 2003 Martin Tielli Subscription Series.

Track listing
 Beauty On
 OK By Me
 The Temperance Society Choir
 Sgt. Kraulis
 Andy by the Lake
 Cold Blooded Old Times
 Winnipeg
 Water Striders
 Ship of Fire
 Kathleen
 National Pride (2003 Martin Tielli Subscription Series version only)
 Diamonds On Our Toes (2003 Martin Tielli Subscription Series version only)

2003 albums
Martin Tielli albums
Six Shooter Records albums